Friedrich Huch (Braunschweig, 19 June 1873 – Munich, 12 May 1913) was a German writer.

Life 
One of his nephews was Friedrich Gerstäcker and one of his cousins was Ricarda Huch on his mother's side. His father killed himself in 1888.

After his Reifeprüfung in Dresden, he studied philosophy at the universities of Munich, Paris and Erlangen. He worked as a personal tutor in Hamburg and Lubocheń, Poland, and travelled through Italy before moving to Munich to become an independent writer.

At the age of 39, he died unexpectedly because of complications after a middle ear surgical procedure. Thomas Mann said his panegyric.

Works 
 Peter Michel, Hamburg, Janssen, 1901.
 Geschwister, Berlin, Fischer, 1903.
 Träume, Berlin, Fischer, 1904.
 Wandlungen, Berlin, Fischer, 1905.
 Mao, Berlin, Fischer, 1907.
 Pitt und Fox. Die Liebeswege der Brüder Sintrup, Ebenhausen bei München, Langewiesche-Brand, 1909.
 Enzio, München, Mörike, 1911.
 Tristan und Isolde. Lohengrin. Der fliegende Holländer. Drei groteske Komödien, Munich, Mörike, 1911.
 Erzählungen, Munich, Georg Müller, 1914.
 Neue Träume, Munich, Georg Müller, 1914. Ausgabe von 1920 mit 20 Illustrationen von Alfred Kubin.
 Romane der Jugend, Berlin, Fischer, 1934.
 References
 Rolf Denecke: Friedrich Huch und die Problematik der bürgerlichen Welt in der Zeit ihres Verfalls. Braunschweig: Univ. Diss. 1937.
 Hugo Hartung: Friedrich Huchs epischer Stil. München: Univ. Diss. 1929.
 Helene Huller: Der Schriftsteller Friedrich Huch. Studien zu Literatur und Gesellschaft um die Jahrhundertwende. München: Univ. Diss. 1975.
 Horst-Rüdiger Jarck, Günter Scheel (Hrsg.): Braunschweigisches Biographisches Lexikon. 19. und 20. Jahrhundert, Hannover 1996, S. 292f.
 Nadia Jollos: Das Werk Friedrich Huchs. Straßburg 1930.
 Wenchao Li: Das Motiv der Kindheit und die Gestalt des Kindes in der deutschen Literatur der Jahrhundertwende. Untersuchungen zu Thomas Manns „Buddenbrooks“, Friedrich Huchs „Mao“ und Emil Strauss' „Freund Hein“. Berlin: Univ. Diss. 1989. 
 Renate Möhrmann: Der vereinsamte Mensch. Studien zum Wandel des Einsamkeitsmotivs im Roman von Raabe bis Musil. 2. Aufl. Bonn u.a.: Bouvier 1976. (= Abhandlungen zur Kunst-, Musik- und Literaturwissenschaft; 149) 
 
 Wolf Wucherpfennig: Kindheitskult und Irrationalismus in der Literatur um 1900. Friedrich Huch und seine Zeit.'' München: Fink 1980.

External links 
 
 Texte von Friedrich Huch (Projekt Gutenberg-DE)

1873 births
1913 deaths
Writers from Braunschweig
People from the Duchy of Brunswick
20th-century German writers
Ludwig Maximilian University of Munich alumni
University of Paris alumni
University of Erlangen-Nuremberg alumni